Ahmet Nakkaş (born 14 November 1962) is a Turkish swimmer. He competed in three events at the 1984 Summer Olympics.

References

1962 births
Living people
Turkish male swimmers
Olympic swimmers of Turkey
Swimmers at the 1984 Summer Olympics
Place of birth missing (living people)
20th-century Turkish people